Simoda is an unincorporated community located in Pendleton County, West Virginia, United States.

The community's name is an amalgamation of the name of Simon Dolly, who was instrumental in securing a post office for the town.

References

Unincorporated communities in Pendleton County, West Virginia
Unincorporated communities in West Virginia